Tropidonophis truncatus is a species of colubrid snake. It is found in Indonesia.

References

Tropidonophis
Reptiles of Indonesia
Reptiles described in 1863
Taxa named by Wilhelm Peters